Gabrielle Ruedas Skribikin (born August 31, 2002), also known as Gabb Skribikin is a Filipino singer and actress under Star Magic. She is a former member of the all-girl Filipino idol group MNL48, and a former a teen housemate on Pinoy Big Brother: Kumunity Season 10. After leaving the group, she entered the PBB house and won the Teen edition of the season. She then signed an exclusive contract on Star Magic and started her solo career.

Career

MNL48 
At the age of 14 Skribikin became a member of MNL48's first generation, which was composed of 48 members and debuted on April 2018. She was one of the top 16 members to perform the debut single of the group Aitakatta - Gustong Makita. She ranked 10th in the first edition of MNL48's General Election. In January of 2019, she was one of the 10 chosen representatives of MNL48 for the first AKB48 Group Asia Festival in Bangkok. She then ranked 12th in the second edition of the Election on April of the same year and was therefore part of the members to perform the group's 4th single Ikaw ang Melody. On November 25, she served as the center for MNL48's 5th single High Tension. She also served as a center for the group's 6th single River together with Abby Trinidad in the later months of 2020. 

This served as her last single in the group after she announced her graduation on June 29, 2021.

Pinoy Big Brother 
Skribikin entered the PBB house as the "Idol Ate of Pasig". She went viral after making up the controversial phrase "MAJOHA" for answering the question wrong about GOMBURZA, during the History Quiz Bee segment of the PBB University group challenge. Skribikin's performance in her game was excellent weeks before her controversy. Escaping the first four eviction rounds even though she didn't won any of the three Head of Household challenges, she got her first and only immunity from eviction for winning the PBB University group challenge along with their group leader and namesake Luke Alford, Ashton Salvador, Eslam El Gohari, Maxine Trinidad, and Tiff Ronato, despite her controversy. The incident prompted viewers to send more BBEs (votes to evict) for her whenever she was up for eviction. She was also awarded a Nomination Immunity Pass on Day 162 for having the most number of new followers during their Follower Sprint campaign.

Skribikin was one of the Final Five housemates of the Teen Kumunity.  Despite losing seven million diamonds to the Teen houseplayers, she got the remaining three million against Alcantara, Blackburn, Jordan, and Trinidad. She would then give 250,000 diamonds each on the four of them. Skribikin then took the second Top Two spot along with Blackburn, and she along with the latter moved to the final part of the season as a Biga-10 housemate.  She along with Blackburn and Jordan won against the Celebrities and Adults on the first and second Kumuni-Testchallenges. Her Kumunity lost on the third and the tie-breaker challenge as the first and third Ultimate Big 5 spots were occupied by the Celebrities, meaning that only one spot will belong to a teen housemate that places first on the open voting period that was placed two days before the Big Night.

Skribikin's game finished as she failed to clinch the final Ultimate Big 5 spot as she had only gained a combined save-to-evict percentage of 14.85% against finalist and felllow Top 2 winner Blackburn's 43.37% and Jordan's 22.84%, therefore evicting her and Jordan. She only placed 7th overall.

Works

Discography

MNL48

Filmography

Films and Series

Television shows

As a member of MNL48

As a solo artist

Web shows

As a member of MNL48

References

External links 

MNL48
Pinoy Big Brother contestants
Filipino singers
Filipino actresses
Living people
2002 births